The United States Military Academy (USMA) is an undergraduate college in West Point, New York that educates and commissions officers for the United States Army. This article lists those alumni of the Military Academy who graduated top, or first, in their class.

All USMA cadets are rated each year; and get a final rating when they graduate. The cadet with the highest class rank is the one that has the best combination of score, academical standing, additional merits and demerits. The United States Military Academy opened in 1802; the initial class having just two cadets. The academy started the practice of ranking its graduates in 1818.



Top-ranking graduates

Notes

References

Academy alumni, famous list
top-ranking
West Point
West Point
United States Army officers